Barnhart Apartments is a historic three-story building in Ogden, Utah. It was built in 1921–1922, and designed in the Prairie School style, with "a deep, flat overhanging cornice, triple-ganged casement
windows, and a vertical front facade emphasis." It has been listed on the National Register of Historic Places since December 31, 1987.

References

Buildings and structures in Ogden, Utah
National Register of Historic Places in Weber County, Utah
Prairie School architecture in Utah
Residential buildings completed in 1922
1922 establishments in Utah